Bonamia elegans is a flowering plant species in the genus Bonamia. It grows in Myanmar.

References

elegans
Flora of Myanmar
Taxa named by Jacques Denys Choisy